Rajinder Singh Jr. is an Indian field hockey coach and player.

Birth and life
Rajinder Singh Jr. was born on 13 May 1959 in Sarih village of Indian Punjab. He started playing field hockey in his childhood and developed an interest in this game. He then joined the Punjab field hockey and was chosen as the best performer. He coached Indian field hockey from 2001–2003 and then from 2005 to 2011.

Coaching career
2004: India women's national field hockey team - Chief coach.
2005-2006: India men's national field hockey team.
Present: Punjab & Sindh Bank field hockey team chief coach cum sports superintendent (awarded the Best Team of India thrice).

Honours and awards 

 Maharaja Ranjit Singh Award (Punjab, 1984) 
 Dhyan Chand Award (2005) 
 Dronacharya Award (2011)

References

External links

Indian sports coaches
Indian Sikhs
Field hockey players from Jalandhar
Living people
1959 births
Field hockey players from Punjab, India
Indian male field hockey players
Recipients of the Dronacharya Award
Field hockey players at the 1984 Summer Olympics
Olympic field hockey players of India
Recipients of the Arjuna Award
Recipients of the Dhyan Chand Award
Field hockey players at the 1982 Asian Games
Medalists at the 1982 Asian Games
Asian Games silver medalists for India
Asian Games medalists in field hockey